The lycée Raspail is a public lycée located in the 14th arrondissement of Paris. It is a general technological and professional lycée which is known as a trade Lycée "of energy and the environment". It offers courses from second year and licences to pass the general bac, the professional bac, preparatory classes (classe préparatoire aux grandes écoles PCSI/PSI, PTSI/PT, TSI) and BTS FED, MS, ET, TC; it also offers around 150 apprenticeships with 5 CFA and more than a hundred adults studying the GRETA GPI2D to prepare for different professional bacs, BTS and licences.

CPGE rankings 

The national ranking of preparatory classes to grandes écoles is the rate of admission of students to the grandes écoles.

In 2015, L'Étudiant gave the following rankings for 2014 :

Notes and references

External links 
 Site officiel du lycée Raspail

Raspail
14th arrondissement of Paris